Sylvia Gytha de Lancey Chapman (27 November 1896–1 September 1995) was a New Zealand medical doctor, medical superintendent and welfare worker. She was born in Dunedin, New Zealand on 27 November 1896.

Chapman graduated from the University of Otago medical school in 1921. She later gained an MD in 1934 and the Dublin Diploma in Gynaecology and Obstetrics. From 1936 to 1946 she was Medical Superintendent of St Helens Hospital in Wellington. In 1946 she was director of the CORSO relief team in Greece. She was appointed resident obstetrician at Dulwich Hospital in London in 1948.

References

1896 births
1995 deaths
New Zealand obstetricians
New Zealand general practitioners
People from Dunedin in health professions
New Zealand medical administrators